Radio is a medium of wireless communication.

Radio may also refer to:

Films
 Radio (2003 film), an American film about James "Radio" Kennedy starring Ed Harris and Cuba Gooding, Jr.
 Radio (2009 film), a Hindi-language Indian film
 Radio (2013 film), a Malayalam-language Indian film

Music

Albums
 Radio (Ky-Mani Marley album), 2007
 Radio (LL Cool J album), 1985
 Radio (Michael Rother album), 1993
 Radio (Naked City album), 1993
 Radio (Steep Canyon Rangers album) or the title song, 2015
 Radio (Wise Guys album) or the title song, 2006
 Radio, or the title song, by Chuck Brodsky, 1998

Songs
 "Radio" (Alesha Dixon song), 2010
 "Radio" (Beyoncé song), 2008
 "Radio" (Cir.Cuz song), 2011
 "Radio" (The Corrs song), 1999
 "Radio" (Danny Saucedo song), 2008
 "Radio" (Darius Rucker song), 2013
 "Radio" (Musiq Soulchild song), 2008
 "Radio" (Rammstein song), 2019
 "Radio" (Robbie Williams song), 2004
 "The Radio" (Get Far song), 2010
 "The Radio" (Vince Gill song), 1988
 "Radio", by Alkaline Trio from Maybe I'll Catch Fire, 2000
 "Radio", by the Avalanches from Since I Left You, 2000
 "Radio", by Big & Rich from Between Raising Hell and Amazing Grace, 2007
 "Radio", by Busted from Half Way There, 2019
 "Radio", by Client from City, 2004
 "Radio", by Christie Front Drive from Christie Front Drive, 1997
 "Radio", by Ed Sheeran from No. 5 Collaborations Project, 2011
 "Radio", by Hot Chelle Rae from Whatever, 2011
 "Radio", by Jamiroquai from High Times: Singles 1992–2006, 2006
 "Radio", by Lana Del Rey from Born to Die, 2012
 "Radio", by Laura White, an outtake from What My Mother Taught Me, 2013
 "Radio", by Matchbox Twenty from North, 2012
 "Radio", by The Members, 1982
 "Radio", by Merrill Nisker from  Fancypants Hoodlum, 1995
 "Radio", by Rancid from Let's Go, 1994
 "Radio", by Saves the Day from Under the Boards, 2007
 "Radio", by Shakin' Stevens, 1992
 "Radio", by Smash Mouth from Astro Lounge, 1999
 "Radio", by Sylvan Esso from What Now, 2017
 "Radio", by Teenage Fanclub from Thirteen, 1993
 "Radio", by Watt White from WWE The Music: A New Day, Vol. 10, 2010
 "Radio", by Yelawolf from Radioactive, 2011
 "Radio (Something to Believe)", by Mest from Not What You Expected, 2013
 "Radio I" and "Radio II", by King Crimson from Thrak

Other uses
Radio button, a graphical control element and a preset to quickly tune in a radio station
Radio (magazine), a radio broadcasting trade publication
 Radio (play), a 2006 play by Al Smith

See also
 Outline of radio
 On the Radio (disambiguation)
 Radio.com